Adam Hagara (born 26 April 2006) is a Slovak figure skater. He is the 2021 Tirnavia Ice Cup champion, 2022 Skate Helena champion, 2021 Skate Celje bronze medalist, 2021 Santa Claus Cup bronze medalist and Slovak national champion.

Personal life 
Adam Hagara was born on 26 April 2006 in Trnava, Slovakia. He is the younger brother of Slovak figure skater Alexandra Hagarová.

Career

Early years 
Hagara began learning to skate in 2010. He competed in the advanced novice ranks in the 2018–19 season and early the following season. His junior international debut came in December 2019 at the Santa Claus Cup in Hungary.

In February 2020, Hagara won the Slovak national junior men's title. In March, he competed at the 2020 World Junior Championships and placed 33rd in the short program. He made no international appearances the following season.

2021–22 season 
Debuting on the ISU Junior Grand Prix series, Hagara placed 13th in Košice, Slovakia, in early September 2021. Later that month, he also made his senior international debut, finishing 23rd at the 2021 CS Nebelhorn Trophy, an Olympic qualifying event. Deciding to continue in the senior ranks, he placed ninth at the Budapest Trophy in Hungary and then won medals at his following three events – gold at the Tirnavia Ice Cup in Slovakia, bronze at Skate Celje in Slovenia, and bronze at the Santa Claus Cup in Hungary. 

In December 2021, Hagara competed as a senior at Four Nationals. He placed third in the short program and fourth overall, 6.63 points behind third-place finisher Vladimir Samoilov, but finished as the best Slovak entry. He was subsequently named in Slovakia's team to the 2022 European Championships in Tallinn, Estonia. He placed 25th at Europeans in January and 26th at the 2022 World Championships, which took place in March in Montpellier, France. In April, he qualified to the final segment at the 2022 World Junior Championships, placing 16th in the short and 21st overall.

2022–23 season 
On the junior level, Hagara began the season with two assignments on the Junior Grand Prix, finishing seventh at the 2022 JGP France and sixth at the second edition of the 2022 JGP Poland. He also won gold in the junior event at the Sofia Trophy.

Competing at the senior level, Hagara had one Challenger assignment, and was eighth at the 2022 CS Nepela Memorial. He had a number of other minor senior internationals, including a silver medal at the Santa Claus Cup, before winning a second Slovak national title at the 2023 Four National Championships, an event where he also finished second overall among the men.

Hagara was eighteenth at the 2023 European Championships.

Programs

Competitive highlights 
CS: Challenger Series; JGP: Junior Grand Prix

References

External links 
 

2006 births
Slovak male single skaters
Living people
Sportspeople from Trnava